West Hobart is an inner-city suburb of Hobart, Tasmania, Australia.  It is in the hills immediately west of the city centre, and shares the postcode 7000 with that district.

History
The area was first settled as a farming district, hosting poultry, dairy, hops, orchards and Chinese market gardens. Various industries have also served in the area, including a brickworks at the top of Arthur Street and coal mines below Summerhill Road. The side of Knocklofty Hill served as a sandstone quarry. Knocklofty is now a reserve maintained by the Hobart City Council. The area around Goulburn and Harrington Streets was once a red-light district.

Hobart West Post Office opened on 12 July 1892.

Considered a 'working-class' suburb until the 1960s, West Hobart has become increasingly a popular inner-city suburb. Many of the houses in the area are older federation-era buildings, prized for their views of the Derwent River.

Today
West Hobart is now considered a bohemian suburb of Hobart, with many artists and musicians living in gentrified Victorian and Federation houses, which abound in the suburb.

Schools in the area include Lansdowne Crescent Primary School, Goulburn Street Primary and the Hobart campus of Guilford Young College on Barrack Street.

References

Suburbs of Hobart
Localities of City of Hobart